Robert Charles Bell (born 26 October 1950) is an English former professional footballer.

Bell, a central defender, began his career as an apprentice with Tottenham Hotspur before playing for Ipswich Town, Blackburn Rovers, Crystal Palace, Norwich City, Hellenic (South Africa), York City and Fort Lauderdale Strikers.

His loan spell with Norwich came during the 1971–72 season when the team won the second division championship. He made three appearances for the club, and was the club's first ever loan player.

References

External links

1950 births
Living people
Sportspeople from Cambridge
English footballers
English expatriate footballers
Association football central defenders
Tottenham Hotspur F.C. players
Ipswich Town F.C. players
Blackburn Rovers F.C. players
Crystal Palace F.C. players
Norwich City F.C. players
Hellenic F.C. players
York City F.C. players
Fort Lauderdale Strikers (1977–1983) players
English Football League players
North American Soccer League (1968–1984) players
Expatriate soccer players in South Africa
Expatriate soccer players in the United States
English expatriate sportspeople in the United States